Francisco Sosa (died 1 July 1520) was a Catholic prelate who served as the second Bishop of Almería (1515–1520).

Biography
On 1 June 1515, he was selected by the King of Spain and confirmed by Pope Leo X as Bishop of Almería. He served as Bishop of Almería until his death on 1 July 1520.

References 

1520 deaths
16th-century Roman Catholic bishops in Spain
Bishops appointed by Pope Leo X